Nácate is a small village in  General Juan Facundo Quiroga Department Department in La Rioja Province in northwestern Argentina.

References
 

Populated places in La Rioja Province, Argentina